Grŵp Llandrillo Menai (GLlM) is an umbrella organisation overseeing the operation of three member colleges in North Wales: Coleg Llandrillo, Coleg Menai and Coleg Meirion-Dwyfor.

It is Wales's largest further-education (FE) institution and one of the largest FE college groups in the UK. It employs 1,650 staff and delivers courses to around 34,000 students across north-west Wales and central north Wales in the counties of Anglesey, Conwy County Borough, Denbighshire and Gwynedd.  As well as thirteen learning sites, the group owns business and research facilities.

Establishment
Grŵp Llandrillo Menai was founded on 2 April 2012 by the corporate merger of Coleg Menai with the legal entity then known as Coleg Llandrillo Cymru (which had already subsumed Coleg Meirion-Dwyfor in 2010).

Locations 
Grŵp Llandrillo Menai's thirteen sites are within the following local communities: Abergele, Bangor, Caernarfon, Colwyn Bay, Denbigh, Dolgellau, Glynllifon (near Llandwrog), Holyhead, Llangefni, Parc Menai (in Treborth near Bangor), Pwllheli, Rhos-on-Sea (near Colwyn Bay) and Rhyl. Many of these community sites are within annexes of libraries, schools and community centres.

Of those, the three principal campuses—that both cover a large area with multiple buildings and act as the headquarters of a constituent college—are, in descending order of size:
 Llandudno Road, Rhos-on-Sea (Coleg Llandrillo)
 Friddoedd Road, Bangor (Coleg Menai)
 Ty'n y Coed Road, Dolgellau (Coleg Meirion-Dwyfor)

External links
 Grŵp Llandrillo Menai
 Grŵp Llandrillo Menai Facebook
 Grŵp Llandrillo Menai Twitter
 Coleg Menai website
 Coleg Llandrillo website
 Coleg Meirion-Dwyfor website

References

 

Universities and colleges in Wales